Borsdorf is a municipality in the Leipzig district in Saxony, Germany.

Geography
Modern Borsdorf municipality consists of three historical villages: Borsdorf (originally the smallest among the three, serving as a toll station at the historical main road from Leipzig to Dresden), Panitzsch (a settlement of Slavic origin) and Zweenfurth (named after a river crossing). All three villages are situated along the Parthe river.

Borsdorf is neighbouring Leipzig in the west, Taucha in the north, Machern in the east and Brandis in the south-east.

Transport

Borsdorf is located at the railway mainline between Leipzig and Dresden. It is served by local commuter trains, the rapid transit network of S-Bahn Mitteldeutschland as well as the Regional Express train (Regionalexpress) Leipzig-Dresden.

The municipality is linked to Leipzig via the B6 federal highway. The closest expressway is Bundesautobahn A14, approx. 4 km west of Borsdorf.

Leipzig-Halle Airport can be reached within 30 minutes by car.

Gallery

Green Belt (Grüner Ring Leipzig) 

Borsdorf is a member of 'Grüner Ring Leipzig' a coordination group of Leipzig and the surrounding municipalities. As part of this, the 'Grüner Ring' (green belt) bicycle round course is running through Borsdorf.

Sons and Daughters

Albrecht Gehse (* 1955), Painter, member of the Leipzig School, known i.a. for his portrait of Helmut Kohl in the Federal German Chancellery building, Berlin

Sarah Klier (* 2. October 1990, was the last baby born in the GDR just two minutes before German reunification on midnight 2./3. October)

References

External links 
 

Leipzig (district)